Qaraqush (also Romanized as Qarāqūsh; also known as Gharaghoosh, Qarāgāch, and Qareh Qāch) is a village in Hureh Rural District, Saman County, Chaharmahal and Bakhtiari Province, Iran. At the 2006 census, its population was 114, in 36 families. The village is populated by Turkic people.

References 

Populated places in Saman County